No One Does It Better is the debut studio album by Canadian pop group soulDecision. The album was recorded in 1999 and released in 2000. The album reached number one on the Billboard Heatseekers chart. No One Does It Better has sold over one million copies worldwide.

Track listing

Year-end charts

Notes 

2000 debut albums
SoulDecision albums
Albums produced by Charles Fisher (producer)